Three Men and a Leg is a 1997 Italian road film and romantic comedy co-written and co-directed by the comedy trio Aldo, Giovanni & Giacomo and by Massimo Venier.

Plot
Three friends – Aldo, Giovanni, and Giacomo – have to travel from Milan to Gallipoli, in Apulia, for Giacomo's wedding. The bride's father, who is the trio's employer and father-in-law as well, is a rich and vulgar businessman who doesn't like his sons-in-law and has given them the task of bringing him a wooden leg, the work of a famous artist who's about to die and will soon become of great value. The three men set off on their journey and soon meet Chiara, a young woman on her way to Greece. Her car breaks down and Aldo, Giovanni and Giacomo will try to help her, which will lead to the blossoming of a beautiful friendship and a deep connection between Giacomo and Chiara that will make him and his friends question the whole point of their journey.

Cast 

Aldo Baglio as Aldo Baglio / Al / Ajeje Brazorf / Dracula
Giovanni Storti as Giovanni Storti / John / Tram Controller  / Gino
Giacomo Poretti as  Giacomino Poretti / Jack / Tram Passenger / Michele
Marina Massironi as  Chiara / Giusy
Carlo Croccolo as   Eros Cecconi
Luciana Littizzetto as  Giuliana Cecconi
Maria Pia Casilio as Miss Cecconi
Augusto Zucchi as The Doctor
 Mohamed El Sayed  as The Moroccan Engineer
 Rosalina Neri as  Aldo's Neighbour

Accolades

See also   
 List of Italian films of 1997

References

External links

1997 romantic comedy films
1997 films
Italian romantic comedy films
Films directed by Massimo Venier
Films set in Milan
1990s Italian-language films
1990s Italian films